Manchester Metropolitan University's Centre for Aviation, Transport and the Environment (CATE) is an international research centre based at the Dalton Research Institute specialising in the environmental impacts of the aviation industry.

Area of research
CATE was established to address the challenges of sustainable aviation development and the environmental capacity of the air transport system though research and knowledge transfer. CATE's researchers work closely with regulatory bodies, which include the International Civil Aviation Organization, the European Commission, the UK Government and the US FAA;aviation sectors such as the airports, airlines and air traffic management organisations; aerospace and aircraft engine manufacturers; academics, research laboratories and NGOs.

CATE's research underpins policy formulation and supports technological development in helping the stakeholders minimise the environmental impacts of aviation to achieve long-term sustainable growth.

Main areas of expertise

Sustainability and the air transport industry
This area of work involves the application of sustainability theory to the air transport industry, the role of aviation in supporting social and economic development, the associated environmental impacts, the need to compensate for growth through the development of new infrastructure, technologies, operations and business models.

Global climate change
The research investigates the impact of airplane emissions upon the climate. Led by Professor David Lee, this research group uses a range of modelling tools to calculate global aviation emissions and scenarios, contrail coverage and simplified climate response models of aviation-specific effects. With the evidence stemming from this research, the group provides advice and support on aviation related climate change issues for UK Government Departments and to fora such as the International Civil Aviation Organization and the UN Framework Convention on Climate Change. The importance of CATE's work in this field is reflected by the contribution of four CATE researchers to the IPCC's seminal 1999 report Aviation and the Global Atmosphere. The IPCC was jointly awarded the 2007 Nobel Peace Prize, and the contribution to the IPCC of many scientists was acknowledged.

Noise and community impacts
Led by Professor Callum Thomas and Dr Paul Hooper, this research group addresses the environmental and community impacts of airports and airline operations within the vicinity of airports. The research programme focuses on issues of regulatory limits, measurement, management and impact of noise on local residents as well as the processes of stakeholder engagement and understanding community attitudes to airport growth.
The UK Governments's night flying policy was underpinned by research carried out by CATE staff (Dr. Ken Hume).
Manchester Airport's noise control programme and community relations programmes were developed with CATE researchers.
More recently, CATE has been commissioned by the NI Government to produce a 'good practice guide' on the measurement and management or aircraft noise for Northern Ireland Airports.

Local air quality
This group focuses on the way airports and airlines deal with air quality issues. CATE provides expertise  in air quality modelling and monitoring and provide advice on how emissions can be managed and reduced. The research group, led by Professor David Raper investigates the fundamental processes that control dispersion of pollutants around airports.
This group researches the impact of wing tip induced vortices on dispersion of aircraft engine exhaust fumes and led one of three Air Quality Panels for Department for Transport while contributing to another, to review the impact of aircraft emissions on air quality around Heathrow Airport.

List of organizations CATE has worked with

Global
The Intergovernmental Panel on Climate Change (IPCC)
The United Nations Framework Convention on Climate Change (UNFCCC)
The International Civil Aviation Organization (ICAO)
Airport Council International World Body (ACI)
The International Air Transport Association (IATA)
The International Commission on the Biologocial Effects of Noise (ICBEN)
The World Economic Forum (WEF)
The US FAA

European
The European Commission (EC)
Noise Pollution Health Effects Reduction (NOPHER)
Airports Council International Europe (ACI-EUROPE)

National
Future of Aviation Policy Advisory Group (DfT)
Aerospace Innovation Growth Team (DTI)
Greener By Design (DfT/DTI)
Commercial Aviation Sustainability Strategy (DTI)

Research partners

Research laboratories

DLR – The German Aerospace Centre
FOI – Swedish Defence Research Agency
NLR – National Aerospace Laboratory - The Netherlands
ONERA – The French Aeronautics and Space Research Centre

Academia
Loughborough University
University of Cambridge
University of Leeds
University of Manchester
University of Nottingham
University of Oxford
University of Reading
University of Sheffield
University of Central Florida (USA)
University of Essen (De)
University of Illinois (USA)
University of l'Aquila (It)
University of Oslo (No)
University of Paris XII (Fr)
University of Stockholm (Sw)
University of Strasbourg (Fr)
University of Trento (It)
University of Utrecht (NL)
University of Wageningen (NL)

Airports
BAA Airports
Belfast
Birmingham
Bucharest
Dublin
Heathrow Airport Limited
Liverpool – John Lennon
Manchester Airport Group
Oslo Airport
The UK Airport Operators Association (AoA)

Airlines
BA
Cathay Pacific
Delta
Lufthansa

Air Traffic Management
CANSO
EUROCONTROL
UK National Air Traffic Services (NATS)

Manufacturers
Airbus
BAE Systems
Boeing
Rolls-Royce

UK Government
UK Government – Office of the Prime Minister
UK Government Department for Environment, Food and Rural Affairs (DEFRA)
UK Government Department for Transport
UK Civil Aviation Administration (UK CAA)
The Civil Aviation Administration of China (CAAC)
US Federal Aviation Administration (FAA)

References

External links 
 

Aviation and the environment
Aviation research institutes
Manchester Metropolitan University
Research institutes in Manchester